Romance is an album by Ali Project, released on December 6, 2006, (the same day that their "Baragoku Otome" single was released) by Tokuma Japan Communications (catalog number: TKCU-77128). It is the fourth album in their series of string and piano orchestration album.

As with the previous albums in the series, this album comprises orchestrated versions of their older works, some new songs, a cover song and an instrumental track. New songs for this album are "La caléche ~ Haru no Yuki", "Saigo no Koi" and "Koyoi, Aoi Mori Fukaku". "L'oiseau bleu" is a vocal cover version of a music piece by Schubert.

Track listing

Ali Project albums
2006 albums